This is a complete list of head coaches of the Pittsburgh Pirates and Philadelphia Quakers in the National Hockey League (NHL). Granted a franchise by the NHL in 1925, the Pirates played in Pittsburgh from 1925 to 1930 and then moved to Philadelphia and became the Philadelphia Quakers. After their only season in Philadelphia, the franchise was cancelled due to financial problems. Both cities were awarded expansion teams over a quarter of a century later (the Flyers and Penguins).

Key

Coaches

See also
List of NHL head coaches

Notes

References
General

 
 

Specific

 
 
Pittsburgh Pirates head coaches